Owksar is a village in Saheli Rural District, in the Central District of Babolsar County, Mazandaran Province, Iran. At the 2006 census, its population was 246, in 67 families.

References 

Populated places in Babolsar County